The R413 road is a regional road in Ireland, which runs west-east from Kildare to Ballymore Eustace, all in County Kildare. En route, it skirts, and largely demarcates,  of the northern edge of the Curragh.

Route 

The official description of the R413 from the Roads Act 1993 (Classification of Regional Roads) Order 2012  reads:

R413: Kildare — Kilcullen — Barrymore Eustace, County Kildare

Between its junction with R415 at Station Road in the town of Kildare and its junction with R412 at Brannockstown via Melitta Road in the town of Kildare; Curragh, Ballymany Cross, Curragh, Kinneagh Cross, Castlemartin, Kilcullen and Newabbey all in the county of Kildare (map of this 17.6 km segment)

and

between its junction with R412 at Brannockstown and its junction with R411 at Main Street Ballymore Eustace via Ardinode West all in the county of Kildare (map of this 5.4 km segment).

See also 
Roads in Ireland
National primary road
National secondary road

References 

Regional roads in the Republic of Ireland
Roads in County Kildare